Canertinib (CI-1033) is an experimental drug candidate for the treatment of cancer.  It is an irreversible tyrosine-kinase inhibitor with activity against EGFR (IC50 0.8 nM), HER-2 (IC50 19 nM) and ErbB-4 (IC50 7 nM). By 2015, Pfizer had discontinued development of the drug.

Canertinib has been reported as a substrate for the transporter protein OATP1B3. Interaction of canertinib with OATP1B3 may alter its hepatic disposition and can lead to transporter mediated drug-drug interactions. Canertinib is not an inhibitor of the OATP1B1 or OATP1B3 transporters.

References

Acrylamides
Tyrosine kinase inhibitors
Quinazolines
4-Morpholinyl compunds
Fluoroarenes
Chloroarenes
Experimental cancer drugs
Abandoned drugs